Wolfgang Krätschmer (born 16 November 1942 in Berlin) is a German physicist.

Krätschmer studied physics in Berlin. After his Diplom he went to the Max Planck Institute for Nuclear Physics in Heidelberg and earned his PhD there in 1971 with a thesis on artificially etched tracks of accelerated heavy ions in quartz. In his career, he has worked on cosmic-ray heavy-ion tracks in lunar samples, as well as infrared and UV spectra of interstellar dust.

Together with his PhD student Konstantinos Fostiropoulos and with Donald Huffman from the University of Arizona he developed a procedure for the synthesis of fullerenes. This procedure was the first to produce fullerenes in large amounts for chemical experiments. Since 1993 he is an honorary professor ("Honorarprofessor") at the University of Heidelberg.

Honors
 1992 – Stern–Gerlach Medal
 1993 – Gottfried Wilhelm Leibniz Prize
 1994 – Hewlett-Packard Europhysics Prize
 2002 – Carl Friedrich Gauss Medaille
 2008 – Liebig Medal
 2008 – Honorary doctorate from the University of Basel
 2010 – European Inventor Award in the "Lifetime Achievement" category awarded by the European Patent Office

References

External links
 Homepage at MPI for Nuclear Physics

20th-century German physicists
Carbon scientists
Gottfried Wilhelm Leibniz Prize winners
1942 births
Living people
European Inventor Award winners
21st-century German physicists